While You Were Gone may refer to:

While You Were Gone, album by Maria D'Luz
"While You Were Gone", song by Kelly Price from Blue Streak (soundtrack)
"While You Were Gone", song by Paul van Dyk from From Then On
"While You Were Gone", song by Jay-Z from Girl's Best Friend
"While You Were Gone", song by Jennifer Paige Flowers and Positively Somewhere
"While You Were Gone", song by English heavy metal band Blaze Bayley, The Man Who Would Not Die (album) 2008